Kapashatia Union is a union parishad of Harinakunda Upazila, in Jhenaidah District, Khulna Division of Bangladesh. There are 21 villages and 10 mouzas in the union.

References

External links
 

Unions of Khulna Division
Unions of Harinakunda Upazila
Unions of Jhenaidah District